Serge Joyal  (born February 1, 1945) is a Canadian politician who served in the House of Commons of Canada from 1974 to 1984 and subsequently in the Senate of Canada from 1997 to 2020.

Career
A lawyer by profession, Joyal served as vice-president of the Quebec wing of the Liberal Party of Canada. He was first elected to the House of Commons of Canada in the 1974 general election and remained a Liberal Member of Parliament for ten years.

In 1978, Joyal, along with a group of concerned Montreal citizens that included Nick Auf der Maur and Robert Keaton, co-founded the Municipal Action Group ("MAG"). Joyal was particularly well known at the time for having supported L’Association des gens de l’air, a group which was criticizing the lack of spoken French by airport controllers. Joyal led the newly formed MAG and ran for mayor against the incumbent, Jean Drapeau. MAG succeeded in electing one member to Montreal council (auf der Maur), but Drapeau's party won 52 seats. As Joyal had not resigned his federal seat, he returned to Ottawa.

Following the 1980 general election, Joyal served as co-chair of the Joint Committee on the Patriation of the Canadian Constitution. In 1982, he joined the Cabinet of Prime Minister Pierre Trudeau as a Minister of State. He was appointed Secretary of State for Canada in 1982. When John Turner succeeded Trudeau in June 1984, Joyal remained in cabinet as Secretary of State. Joyal but lost his seat in the 1984 election that defeated the Turner government. On November 26, 1997, Joyal was appointed to the Senate of Canada on the recommendation of Prime Minister Jean Chrétien and serves on a number of committees specialising in legal and constitutional affairs.

With the Senate Liberal Caucus facing losing official parliamentary caucus status in 2020 with a third of its caucus facing mandatory retirements on their turning age 75, Senator Joseph Day announced that the Senate Liberal Caucus had been dissolved and a new Progressive Senate Group formed in its wake, with the entire membership joining the new group, including this senator.

Joyal is an Officer of the Order of Canada, Officer of the National Order of Quebec and is also a Chevalier in France's Légion d’Honneur. He is an expert art collector and appraiser.  In recent years, he has used his knowledge of the art world and his influence on the Senate and the government to get Parliament to assemble a collection of original portraits of the kings of France for the period during which Canada was first explored and colonized by France.  In 2004, these paintings were placed on the walls of the Salon de la Francophonie, featured in the Centre Block of the Parliament Buildings, as companions to the portraits of the British and then Canadian monarchs who had been the sovereigns of the territories forming Canada since 1763.

He retired from the senate reaching the age of 75, after more than 22 years of representing Kennebec on 31 January 2020.

Electoral record

References

External links 

Official site
Liberal Senate Forum

1945 births
Alumni of the London School of Economics
Canadian art collectors
Canadian senators from Quebec
Chevaliers of the Légion d'honneur
French Quebecers
Lawyers from Montreal
Liberal Party of Canada MPs
Liberal Party of Canada senators
Senate Liberal Caucus
Progressive Senate Group
Living people
Members of the 22nd Canadian Ministry
Members of the 23rd Canadian Ministry
Members of the House of Commons of Canada from Quebec
Members of the King's Privy Council for Canada
Officers of the National Order of Quebec
Officers of the Order of Canada
Politicians from Montreal
21st-century Canadian politicians